Hockenberry is an American television talk show-style current affairs program that aired on MSNBC in 1998 and 1999. It was hosted by and named after journalist John Hockenberry and aired each weeknight.

Hockenberry was created as a replacement for The Big Show when host Keith Olbermann departed. The show was canceled in July 1999 after six months. The time slot was filled by Hardball with Chris Matthews.

References

External links

1990s American television talk shows
1998 American television series debuts
1999 American television series endings
English-language television shows
MSNBC original programming